Ivelin Yanev (born 23 November 1981) is a Bulgarian footballer who plays as a defender for FC Karnobat.

He was born in Burgas, Bulgaria.

References

1981 births
Living people
Bulgarian footballers
First Professional Football League (Bulgaria) players
Neftochimic Burgas players
PFC Chernomorets Burgas players
OFC Sliven 2000 players
FC Chernomorets Balchik players
FC Etar 1924 Veliko Tarnovo players
PFC Cherno More Varna players
FC Lokomotiv 1929 Sofia players

Association football defenders